Philip Samson Terry (August 1, 1876 – June 11, 1936) was an American politician who served in the Missouri Senate between 1927 and 1935.  He previously served as mayor of Festus, Missouri, from 1913 to 1917.  Terry was educated in public school.

References

1876 births
1936 deaths
Missouri lawyers
Republican Party Missouri state senators
Mayors of places in Missouri
People from Festus, Missouri